Flipping 101 with Tarek El Moussa is a reality television series airing on HGTV. It features real estate agent Tarek El Moussa, best known for his previous show Flip or Flop, mentoring real estate novices wanting to learn the secrets of a successful house flip. The show premiered in 2020 and was given a one-hour format for its second season in 2021. The show has been renewed for a third season, slated to premiere in 2023.

Episodes

Series overview

Season 1 (2020)

Season 2 (2021)

References

External links
 
 

HGTV original programming
2020 American television series debuts